Matthiessen is a Danish-Norwegian patronymic surname meaning "son of Mathies" (equivalent of the Biblical Μαθθαιος, cf. English Matthew). Several spelling variants are used, including Matthiesen, Mathiesen, Matthissen (UK), Matthisen and Mathissen. A similar diversity of forms exist for the parallel given name Mathias.
There are several people with the surname Matthiessen:

 Augustus Matthiessen (1831–1870), British physicist and chemist, notable for Matthiessen's rule
 C.M.I.M. Matthiessen, Swedish linguist
 Francis Otto Matthiessen (1902–1950), U.S. literary critic
 Frederick William Matthiessen (1835–1918), Industrialist, philanthropist, and former Mayor of LaSalle, Illinois
 Peter Matthiessen (1927 2014), American novelist

See also  
Matheson (surname)
Mathiasen
Mathiesen

Danish-language surnames
Norwegian-language surnames
Patronymic surnames
Surnames from given names